La hija pródiga is a Mexican telenovela that premiered on Azteca Uno on October 23, 2017, is an original story by José Ignacio Valenzuela produced by Ana Celia Urquidi for TV Azteca, which stars Isabel Burr and Christian de la Campa. The series follows the Montejo family, who on a trip their eldest daughter, Alicia (Isabel Burr), disappears without explanation. After learning to live with the loss, 20 years later the girl reappears and changes the life of each member of her family.

Plot 
The story begins when the daughter of the Montejo's, Alicia (Isabel Burr), is kidnapped in Acapulco, while her parents are absent for an important business dinner. The girl accompanied by her sister Pamela (Andrea Martí), is subtracted provoking a great sadness in her family for years.

Twenty years later, when her family has been able to resume their lives, Alicia reappears at Montejo's house to find answers. This fact will unleash a series of conflicts between the family because Alicia only seeks the truth and in this quest will find love in Salvador (Christian de la Campa), the betrothed of his sister, provoking a love triangle that will lead us to witness the obstacles that Alicia must cross to find out who or who were to blame for his tragedy.

Cast 
 Isabel Burr as Alicia Montejo
 Christian de la Campa as Salvador Mendoza
 Alejandro Camacho as Rogelio Montejo
 Leonardo Daniel as Federico Campomanes
 Andrea Martí as Pamela Montejo
 Carmen Delgado as Lucha
 Aura Cristina Geithner as Isabel
 Sharis Cid as Delia
 Aldo Gallardo as Arturo Montejo
 María Adelaida Puerta as Beatriz Castellanos
 Rodolfo Arias as Jacobo
 Marcelo Buquet as Antonio
 Ramiro Huerta as Emilio
 Martha Mariana Castro as Nora
 Diana Quijano as Matilde Rojas
 Eligio Meléndez as Edgar
 Pakey Vazquez as Jack
 Adianez Hernández as Virginia
 Francisco Angelini as José
 Leon Michel as Padre Damián
 Jack Duarte as Dany Mendoza
 Saul Hernández as Lalo Montejo
 Joan Kuri as Blas Montejo
 Dahanna Dhenider as Marifer Mendoza
 Iván Cortes as Abel
 Ethan as Carlitos
 Fernando Luján as Nelson
 Carmen Baqué as La Guera
 Hugo Catalán as Beto

References

External links 

2017 telenovelas
2017 Mexican television series debuts
2018 Mexican television series endings
Mexican telenovelas
Azteca Uno original programming
TV Azteca telenovelas
Mexican LGBT-related television shows
Spanish-language telenovelas